Boroondara General Cemetery, often referred to as Kew cemetery, is one of the oldest cemeteries in Victoria, Australia, created in the tradition of the Victorian garden cemetery. The cemetery, located in Kew, a suburb of Melbourne, is listed as a heritage place on the Victorian Heritage Register.

History
The  cemetery site was reserved in 1855 and trustees were first appointed in 1858. A site plan was drawn up by Frederick Acheson, a civil engineer in the Public Lands Office, with the layout segregated by religious denomination, a common occurrence at the time. The first burial took place in 1859.

In 1864 Albert Purchas, who was architect and surveyor for the Melbourne General Cemetery, joined the trust. Purchas is believed to be the designer of the landscape layout as well as many of the features of the cemetery including the cast iron entrance gates (1889), the rotunda (1890) and the surrounding ornamental brick wall (1895–96), as well as various additions to the original 1860 Cottage in the period 1866–1899 including the clock tower. The design of the cemetery was influenced by the Victorian garden cemetery movement. This influence was reflected in the curving path network following the contours of the site, the creation of defined views and a park like setting.

In the latter half of the twentieth century the cemetery was becoming full and many pathways and grassed verges were used to provide new burial sites. At the same time, many of the older Victorian monuments began to fall into disrepair due to their age and lack of funding to maintain them. However, since about 2010, with the assistance of enthusiastic volunteers from the Friends of Boroondara (Kew) Cemetery, the cemetery is undergoing a horticultural renaissance, returning to its early glory as a garden cemetery.

In 2001 the Peace Haven Mausoleum was built by the Cemetery Trust to cater for growing demand for above-ground burials and interments, and in 2011 garden crypts were opened in a bushland setting near the High Street pedestrian gate.  The cemetery is still an operating cemetery, offering a range of burial and interment options.

Burials and memorials

The cemetery has had more than 80,000 burials since 1859. Among these are some very prominent Melburnians. The Syme memorial was constructed in 1908 in memory of David Syme, publisher of The Age newspaper. It has a temple-like appearance and Egyptian motifs. Between 1889 and 1907 the Springthorpe Memorial was constructed on behalf of Dr John Springthorpe in memory of his wife, Annie and in 1912 the Cussen Memorial was commissioned by Sir Leo Cussen, a judge of the Victorian Supreme Court as a memorial to his son, Hubert. The latter is a small chapel designed in the Gothic Revival style.

The Springthorpe and Cussen Memorials are listed separately on the Victorian Heritage Register.

Notable interments
 John Arthur Andrews (1865–1903), anarchist, journalist, poet, linguist
 George Henry Bennett (1850–1908), brewer, benefactor, politician, Mayor of Richmond, president of Richmond Football Club
 Graham Berry (1822–1904), Premier of Victoria
 Joseph Bosisto (1827–1898), chemist, politician, eucalyptus manufacturer and advocate
 Louis Buvelot (1814–1888), artist
 E.W.Cole (1832–1918), "Cole of the Book Arcade", bookseller and children's book publisher
 Amalie Colquhoun (1894–1974), artist
 Madge Connor (1874–1952), pioneering police officer, private investigator
 Evelyn Conyers (1870–1944), Australian army nursing matron
 Leo Cussen (1859–1933), jurist
 William Davidson (1844–1920), engineer, pioneer of Melbourne's water supply
 Owen Dixon (1886–1972), Chief Justice
 Edmund Duggan (1862–1938), actor & playwright
 Frank Gavan Duffy (1852–1936), Chief Justice
 Edward Dunn (1844–1937), geologist
 William Fitchett (1841–1928), journalist, educator
 Major General John Forsyth (1867–1928), soldier
 Thomas Sergeant Hall (1858–1915), scientist
 Lesbia Harford (1891–1927), poet
 H.C.A. Harrison (1836–1929), sports administrator, pioneer of Australian Rules Football
 Helen Hart (1842–1908), feminist, evangelist
 Edythe Ellison Harvie (1902–1984), architect
 Edward Henty (1812–1878), pioneer
 Major General Godfrey Irving (1867–1937), soldier
 Jules François de Sales Joubert (1824–1907), impresario, prospector
 Ian MacFarlan (1881–1964), Premier of Victoria
 Marion Macfarlane (1840–1898), Anglican deaconess and Roman Catholic nun
 John Simpson Mackennal (1832–1901), sculptor & architect
 Mona McBurney (1862–1932), composer
 Georgiana McCrae (1804–1890), pioneer, artist, diarist
 William Murray McPherson (1865–1932), Premier of Victoria
 John Michell (1863–1940), mathematician
 Francis Murphy (1809–1891), politician, first Speaker of the Victorian Legislative Assembly
 Charles Nuttall (1872–1934), artist, writer
 William Orr (1843–1929), mining magnate and politician
 John Gibson Paton (1824–1907), Presbyterian missionary to Vanuatu
 Carl Pinschof (1855–1926), merchant, consul, arts patron
 Albert Purchas (1825–1909), architect, surveyor
 Joseph Reed (1823–1890), architect
 Stanley Savige (1890–1954), soldier, founder of Legacy
 John Springthorpe (1855–1933), physician
 Nellie Stewart (1858–1931), actor and singer
 George Sutherland (1855–1905), author & journalist
 David Syme (1827–1908), newspaper proprietor
 Camillo Triaca (1887–1902), sculptor & restaurateur
 Elise Wiedermann (1851–1922), soprano
 David Wang (1920–1978), retailer, councillor, Chinese community pioneer
 Basil Watson (1894–1917), aviator
 John Wisker (1846–1884), British chess champion
 John Wren (1851–1953), bookmaker, businessman, political operator
 John Dickson Wyselaskie (1818–1883), grazier, benefactor
 Alberto Zelman (1874–1927), conductor, founder of Melbourne Symphony Orchestra

War graves
The cemetery contains the war graves of 45 Commonwealth service personnel, 30 from World War I and 15 from World War II.

Trees
The cemetery has a notable collection of mature trees including rows of Bhutan Cypress (Cupressus torulosa) and Italian cypress (Cupressus sempervirens 'Italica'), as well as specimens of Bunya Bunya (Araucaria bidwillii), Canary Island Pine (Pinus canariensis), Weeping Elms (Ulmus glabra 'Camperdownii'), Queensland Kauri (Agathis robusta) and Weeping Cypress (Cupressus funebris).

References

External links

 Boroondara General Cemetery (official site)
 Boroondara General Cemetery – Billion Graves
 Victorian Heritage Register: Boroondara General Cemetery
 Victorian Heritage Register: Boroondara General Cemetery (rtf)
 Friends of Boroondara (Kew) General Cemetery Inc.

Heritage sites in Melbourne
Cemeteries in Melbourne
Heritage-listed buildings in Melbourne
1859 establishments in Australia
Commonwealth War Graves Commission cemeteries in Australia
Buildings and structures in the City of Boroondara